Get Rich or Die Tryin': Music from and Inspired by the Motion Picture is the soundtrack to the 2005 film of the same name, released on November 8, 2005, on Interscope Records and 50 Cent's G-Unit Records. It features artists on the G-Unit label such as 50 Cent (who also executive produced the album), Lloyd Banks, Young Buck, Tony Yayo, Olivia, and Mobb Deep. The album sold 320,000 copies in the first week, debuting behind country singer Kenny Chesney's The Road and the Radio. In December 2005, the RIAA certified the album Platinum. To date, the album has sold over three million copies worldwide.

Singles
 "Hustler's Ambition" was released as the album's lead single on August 9, 2005. The single is Jackson's personal favourite. The single peaked at #65 on Billboard Hot 100. The song is about Jacksons' rough time growing up and how he had to hustle to keep up with life.
 "Window Shopper" was released as the album's second single on November 6, 2005, and serves as the film's theme song. The single peaked at #20 on the Hot 100. The single's version has a slightly different chorus, in which Jackson claims that Ja Rule, Jadakiss, Nas and Fat Joe are window shoppers, as he was feuding with these rappers at the time.
 "Best Friend" was released as the album's third single on January 19, 2006. The single version features Olivia. The single peaked #35 on the Hot 100. The song is used throughout the film as a way for Marcus, Jackson's character, to lyrically flirt with Charlene, his love interest.
 "Have a Party" was released as the album's fourth single on March 2, 2006. The song features Mobb Deep and Nate Dogg. The single peaked at #105 on the Hot 100, and was the worst performing single from the album. It also the least heard song from the album, only appearing in a very short segment when Marcus was in prison.
 "I'll Whip Ya Head Boy" was released as the fifth and final single from the album on May 24, 2006. The song features Young Buck, and the single version also includes M.O.P. The single peaked at #74 on the Hot 100, becoming the second worst performing single from the album. A number of remixes were also released.

Track listing
Credits adapted from the album's liner notes.

Sample credits
 "Hustler's Ambition" contains elements from "I Need You" (Beverly), performed by Frankie Beverly & Maze.
 "What If" contains elements from "Woman's Gotta Have It" (Womack/Carter/Cooke), performed by Bobby Womack.
 "When Death Becomes You" contains elements from "You're Gone But Always In My Heart" (Holland/Dozier/Holland), performed by The Supremes.
 "Fake Love" contains elements from "Everybody Loves the Sunshine" (Ayers), written and performed by Roy Ayers.
 "Window Shopper" contains elements from "Burnin' and Lootin'" (Marley), performed by Bob Marley.
 "Born Alone, Die Alone" contains elements from "Friends or Lovers" (Gerald), performed by Act One.
 "Best Friend" contains elements from "Silly, Wasn't I" (Armstead/Ashford/Simpson), performed by Valerie Simpson.

Charts

Weekly charts

Year-end charts

Certifications

References

50 Cent albums
Albums produced by Dr. Dre
Albums produced by Havoc (musician)
Albums produced by Hi-Tek
Albums produced by J. R. Rotem
Albums produced by Ron Browz
Albums produced by Nick Speed
Albums produced by DJ Khalil
Albums produced by Jake One
Albums produced by Fredwreck
Hip hop soundtracks
2005 soundtrack albums
Interscope Records soundtracks
G-Unit Records soundtracks
Aftermath Entertainment soundtracks
Crime film soundtracks
Drama film soundtracks